A Better Life is a 2011 American drama film directed by Chris Weitz and written by Eric Eason. It is based on Roger L. Simon's story and follows an undocumented immigrant gardener and his son finding their rent-to-own truck. For his performance, Demián Bichir was nominated for the Academy Award for Best Actor.

Plot
Carlos Galindo is a gardener of Los Angeles working with his partner, Blasco. His son, Luis, studies at high school. Luis spends time with his girlfriend, who is affiliated with gang members. They pressure him to join them. On one occasion, Luis is suspended for assaulting a student. 

Carlos' sister, Anita, lends $12,000 from the family's emergency fund for Carlos to buy Blasco's truck. It is later stolen by Santiago, whom Carlos hired. The next day, Carlos and Luis head to the South Central apartment complex, which is used as lodgings for undocumented immigrant workers. One man tells the two that Santiago works at the nightclub. Carlos and Luis head to the restaurant, which would open during the night. At the rodeo, Carlos mentions to Luis about his mother abandoning them. 

Luis mentions that he dislikes Mexican music and culture. After finding Santiago at the nightclub, Carlos and Luis interrogate him in the parking lot. They learn that he has sold the truck to the garage and sent the money to his family in El Salvador. When Santiago pleads not guilty, Carlos defends him and Luis angrily leaves them. The next day, Carlos convinces Luis to go with him to the place where the truck is sold. 

After retrieving the truck, they are stopped by the police. Carlos is arrested and incarcerated as an undocumented American immigrant. Luis visits the detention center and reconciles with his father. After promising Luis that he will return, Carlos boards the deportation bus. Luis spends time with the family, while Carlos and other migrants travel through the desert.

Cast
 Demián Bichir as Carlos Galindo
 José Julián as Luis Galindo
 Dolores Heredia as Anita
 Carlos Linares as Santiago
 Eddie "Piolín" Sotelo as himself
 Joaquín Cosío as Blasco Martinez
 Nancy Lenehan as Mrs. Donnely
 Gabriel Chavarria as Ramon

Production
The film was originally titled The Gardener. Uncommon among Hollywood productions, it is set in a Hispanic community and features an almost entirely Hispanic cast. 

Weitz used the film to explore the culture and geography of Los Angeles. Father Gregory Boyle of Homeboy Industries, run by former gang members, helped Weitz and his crew with finding locations and making their film as authentic as possible. The language of the script was modified to reflect the actual slang used in Los Angeles, even reflecting linguistic differences from the street.

Release
The film opened in limited release on June 24, 2011.

Critical reception
Critical response to the film has been positive. The critical consensus reads: "Powered by a terrific performance from Demián Bichir, A Better Life is an immigrant story told with simplicity and an ample amount of heart." The critical aggregator Metacritic awarded the film a score of 64 out of 100, based on 30 critics, signifying "generally positive reviews". 

Manohla Dargis, film critic for The New York Times, called the film "Touching and startling." Peter Travers of Rolling Stone called the film "a haunting movie that gets under your skin." 

Writing for Entertainment Weekly, Dave Karger called A Better Life an "unfussy, yet quite powerful drama with a terrific central performance by Demián Bichir." Karger called the film an "awards contender" and wrote, "With the right reviews and commercial reception, it could go even further." Roger Ebert of the Chicago Sun-Times, wrote "the performances are pitch perfect" and he gave the film three and a half out of four stars. 

The New Yorker critic Richard Brody wrote: "The story unfolds without hagiography, pity, or trumped-up heroism, as the filmmaker approaches the lives of everyday people with modest compassion and imaginative sympathy. Amy Biancolli, writing in the Houston Chronicle, said "It's straight, true and heartbreaking, a masterstroke of raw emotional minimalism".

Awards

Telenovela version
Telemundo produced a telenovela adaptation, Bajo el mismo cielo, starring Gabriel Porras and María Elisa Camargo. It aired from July 28, 2015 to January 25, 2016.

References

External links

2011 films
2010s English-language films
2010s Spanish-language films
2011 drama films
2011 independent films
Hood films
American drama films
American independent films
Films directed by Chris Weitz
Films set in Los Angeles
Films shot in Los Angeles
Summit Entertainment films
Hispanic and Latino American films
Hispanic and Latino American culture
Films about illegal immigration to the United States
Films scored by Alexandre Desplat
2011 multilingual films
American multilingual films
2010s American films